"The House of Blue Lights" is a popular song published in 1946, written by Don Raye and Freddie Slack. It was first recorded by Freddie Slack with singer Ella Mae Morse, and was covered the same year by The Andrews Sisters.

Background
Notably for the time, the song featured a "hipster"-style spoken introduction by Raye and Morse:
"Well, whatcha say, baby?  You look ready as Mr. Freddy this black. How 'bout you and me goin' spinnin' at the track?"
"What's that, homie?  If you think I'm goin' dancin' on a dime, your clock is tickin' on the wrong time."
"Well, what's your pleasure, treasure?  You call the plays, I'll dig the ways."
"Hey daddy-o, I'm not so crude as to drop my mood on a square from way back......."

The version by Morse and Slack reached # 8 on the Billboard pop chart, and the version by The Andrews Sisters reached # 15.

Other recordings
Chuck Miller reached no. 9 on the Billboard pop singles chart with a recording on Mercury Records in 1955.

The song itself was later recorded by Earl Richards, Merrill Moore, Chuck Berry, Jerry Lee Lewis, Freddy Cannon, Canned Heat, Crowbar, Commander Cody & His Lost Planet Airmen, The Flamin' Groovies, Mitch Woods, Meat Puppets, George Thorogood and others. 

A cover by Asleep at the Wheel peaked at number 17 on the Billboard Hot Country Singles chart in 1987.

Little Richard made reference to the "house of blue lights" in his 1958 hit "Good Golly, Miss Molly".

References

Sources
"Chuch Miller". Tims.blackcat.nl. Retrieved 29 September 2021.
Colin Larkin, ed. (1992). The Guinness Encyclopedia of Popular Music (First ed.). Guinness Publishing. p. 1690. ISBN 0-85112-939-0.
"Chuck Miller". Rockabilly.nl. Retrieved 2016-05-20.

1946 songs
1940s songs
Songs written by Don Raye
Asleep at the Wheel songs
Ella Mae Morse songs
Meat Puppets songs